State Route 187 (SR 187) is a  state highway that serves as a north-south connection through central Franklin and Marion Counties. SR 187 intersects US 43 at its southern terminus and SR 24 at its northern terminus.

Route description
SR 187 begins just north of Hamilton at its intersection with US 43. From this point, the route travels in a northerly direction except for a brief turn to the east where it meets SR 172 in Hodges. From Hodges, SR 187 returns to its northerly routing en route to its northern terminus at SR 24 in Belgreen.

Major intersections

References

187
Transportation in Franklin County, Alabama
Transportation in Marion County, Alabama